Dhanuka Pathirana (born 26 May 1982) is a Sri Lankan cricketer. He played 85 first-class and 61 List A matches for various domestic teams in Sri Lanka between 2001 and 2012. He made his Twenty20 debut on 17 August 2004, for Burgher Recreation Club in the 2004 SLC Twenty20 Tournament.

In May 2017, he played for the Canadian national team in the 2017 ICC World Cricket League Division Three tournament. In January 2018, he was named in Canada's squad for the 2018 ICC World Cricket League Division Two tournament.

References

External links
 

1982 births
Living people
Basnahira North cricketers
Burgher Recreation Club cricketers
Colts Cricket Club cricketers
Kurunegala Youth Cricket Club cricketers
Sri Lanka Police Sports Club cricketers
Canadian cricketers
Sri Lankan cricketers
Cricketers from Colombo